Hans Davidsson (born 1958) is a Swedish organist and pedagogue. He was one of the driving forces behind establishing the organ research center GOArt and the Eastman Rochester Organ Initiative. He is currently professor of organ at the Royal Danish Academy of Music.

Life
Davidsson was born in Gothenburg and studied organ at its university with Hans Fagius and Rune Wåhlberg. He later spent three years at the Sweelinck Conservatory, Amsterdam, studying with Jacques van Oortmerssen. He began teaching organ at the university in 1986 and was appointed professor in 1988. In 1991 he became the first doctor of music performance in Sweden, successfully defending his dissertation on the organ music of Matthias Weckmann.

From 1995 until 2000 he was the director of the Göteborg Organ Art Center, GOArt, leading research in organ building and performance practice. From 2001 to 2012 he worked at the Eastman School of Music serving as professor of organ and project director of the Eastman Rochester Organ Initiative. In 2007 he was appointed professor of organ at University of the Arts Bremen and in 2011 professor of organ at the Royal Danish Academy of Music.

In January 2004 he was awarded H. M. The King's Medal for "significant accomplishments in musicology and music, primarily in the fields of organ research and organ education".

Selected Recordings
 Eastman Italian Baroque Organ (2006), with David Higgs and William Porter.
 French Symphonic Masterpieces (2002)
 The Complete Organ Works of Matthias Weckman, recorded twice, in 1991 on the organ in the Ludgerikirche, Norden and in 2004 on the North German baroque organ in Örgryte Nya Kyrka, Gothenburg, Sweden.
 The complete organ works of Dieterich Buxtehude: Dieterich Buxtehude and the Mean-Tone Organ, Dieterich Buxtehude: the Bach perspective. and Buxtehude and the Schnitger Organ

References

External links
 Göteborg International Organ Academy faculty page
 Artist page at Gothic records

1958 births
Swedish classical organists
Male classical organists
University of Gothenburg alumni
Academic staff of the University of Gothenburg
Living people
Conservatorium van Amsterdam alumni
21st-century organists
21st-century Swedish male musicians
Academic staff of the University of the Arts Bremen